is a passenger railway station in the city of Abiko, Chiba Prefecture, Japan, operated by East Japan Railway Company (JR East).

Lines
Araki Station is served by the 32.9 km Abiko Branch Line of the Narita Line, and lies 8.9 kilometers from the terminus of the line at Abiko Station.

Layout
The station consists of a single island platform serving two tracks.  The elevated station building is built on a cantilever above and across the platform. The station is staffed.

Platforms

History
Araki Station opened on April 1, 1958. The station was absorbed into the JR East network upon the privatization of Japanese National Railways (JNR) on April 1, 1987.

Passenger statistics
In fiscal 2019, the station was used by an average of 2871 passengers daily.

Surrounding area
 
 Fusa Minami Elementary School

See also
 List of railway stations in Japan

References

External links

  

Railway stations in Japan opened in 1958
Railway stations in Chiba Prefecture
Narita Line
Abiko, Chiba